Valproate pivoxil (Pivadin, Valproxen) is an anticonvulsant used in the treatment of epilepsy. It is the pivaloyloxymethyl ester derivative of valproic acid. It is likely a prodrug of valproic acid, as pivoxil esters are commonly employed to make prodrugs in medicinal chemistry.

See also
 Valproate
 Valpromide
 Valnoctamide

References

Anticonvulsants
GABA analogues
GABA transaminase inhibitors
Histone deacetylase inhibitors
Mood stabilizers
Prodrugs
Pivalate esters